Eyik (Eeyik) is a lake in the Sakha Republic (Yakutia), Russia. It is the largest lake in Olenyoksky District.

Lake Eyik provides a habitat for the Siberian Crane, a Critically Endangered species.

Geography
Eyik is located in the eastern part of the Central Siberian Plateau. Located at southern end of Olenyoksky District. Eyik village lies near the northern lakeside. 

Lake Eyik is almost round in shape. There are a few small islands in the southwestern area of the lake, not far from the shoreline. The outflow of the lake is a left tributary of the Tyukyan, a river of the Lena basin, flowing from the southern shore in a southeastern direction. The sources of river Tyukyan are in a large wooded swamp to the west of the lake.

See also
List of lakes of Russia

References

External links
Прокопьев, Мордосов. Эл. изд..pdf - СВФУ
Lakes of the Sakha Republic
Central Siberian Plateau
Lena basin